Duraheh-ye Sofla Gelal (also Romanized as Dūrāheh-ye Soflá Gelāl) is a village in Chin Rural District, Ludab District, Boyer-Ahmad County, Kohgiluyeh and Boyer-Ahmad Province, Iran. At the 2006 census, its population was 64, in 13 families.

References 

Populated places in Boyer-Ahmad County